The Natal Border Guard (also known as the River Guards) was an auxiliary force levied for the defence of the Colony of Natal during the Anglo-Zulu War of 1879.  British military commander Lord Chelmsford had intended to raise a large auxiliary force to support his invasion of the Zulu Kingdom but was opposed by the civilian government of the Colony of Natal, led by its governor Henry Ernest Gascoyne Bulwer, who would have to finance the unit.  Bulwer eventually allowed a smaller force (of 2,800 men) to be raised with the stipulation that it not be deployed outside of Natal.  This unit was to serve only on a part-time basis, receive no training and fight with the traditional weapons of spear and shield.

Following the defeat of the British force during the Battle of Isandlwana the Border Guard was strengthened and equipped with a limited number of firearms.  The unit fought in defence of the border against Zulu counter-raids into Natal.  One of the Border Guard commanders was responsible for negotiating the submission of a number of Zulu chiefs in the border region after the end of the war.

Origin 
The British High Commissioner for Southern Africa Sir Henry Bartle Frere had ambitions to form a confederation of all the British possessions in Southern Africa. He planned the annexation of the independent Zulu Kingdom, which was opposed by King Cetshwayo and led to the Anglo-Zulu War of 1879. As part of preparations for this war the British military commander in Southern Africa, Frederic Thesiger (who later became Lord Chelmsford and is more commonly known by that name), implemented defensive measures in the British Colony of Natal.

Natal's border with the Zulu Kingdom lay along the Mzinyathi (Buffalo) and Thukela (Tugela) rivers.  Natal was split into seven defensive districts of which three directly bordered Zululand.  To defend this border Chelmsford sought to raise a 6,000-strong auxiliary force under control of the civil authorities.  This would supplement the existing Natal Native Contingent (NNC) auxiliary which was under military control and expected to participate in the forthcoming invasion.  The existing Natal volunteer military units were insufficient to ensure defence of the colony as many had been earmarked to form part of the invading force.

Formation 
The Natal government was liable for the costs of any force raised specifically for the defence of the colony.  They were unwilling to finance Chelmsford's proposed auxiliary force proposed but did agree to fund a smaller border guard unit.  The Natal Border Guard was raised from 20 December 1878 by a levy on the African men residing in each defensive district; officers were white volunteers.  The unit initially numbered some 2,800 men who rotated between active service and reserve duty.  Those on reserve were allowed to return home to tend to their crops and livestock, a measure that limited costs by reducing the need for the government to provide food, shelter and clothing.  The men initially received no formal training, uniform or weapons and were expected to fight in their traditional tribal style with spears and shields.  The units were organised on tribal lines under the leadership of local chiefs.  Recruitment was slow; there was little enthusiasm as compensation payments to the chiefs were delayed and the population was demotivated by the recent implementation of a hut tax.  Some units of the Border Guard were still not fully formed by April 1879.

Chelmsford commenced his invasion of Zululand in January 1879 and intended that the campaign would be over with the submission of the Zulu people before the rivers fell low enough to permit a Zulu counter invasion of Natal.  The Natal Border Guard was formally under the control of the civilian government of the colony but Governor Henry Ernest Gascoyne Bulwer conceded that operational control lay with Chelmsford.

At the outset of the war the Border Guard were posted to fixed points at or near fordable points (known locally as drifts) on the border rivers at points where no other British or colonial garrison was provided.  These posts were typically 300–350 strong.  The Border Guard were nominally commanded by the commandants of each defensive district.  Due to their deployment and expected duties the unit was also known as the "River Guards".

Service

First invasion 
The British invasion force crossed into Zululand on 11 January 1879 in three columns.  At the outset of the war the Border Guard in the Sand Spruit Valley near to Umsinga were under the command of British Colonel Anthony Durnford who was tasked with defending the border at this location.  Durnford was soon, however, ordered to move up to the border crossing at Rorke's Drift in support of Chelmsford's no. 3 column.  On 22 January he was ordered to bring his men (not including the Border Guard) to the British camp at Isandlwana, within Zululand.  Durnford and his men were wiped out in the British defeat at the Battle of Isandlwana later that day.

The district commandant doubted this intelligence which came from a Natal native and was passed on by a farmer acting in a temporary capacity as a stand-in for a Border Guard officer. The district commandant gathered his Border Guard on the Natal side of the river to counter the threat but a reconnaissance party concluded that the informant had mistaken men of Chelmsford's 3rd Regiment of NNC for Zulu forces. They later assisted the men of the 2nd NNC under Harcourt Mortimer Bengough to cross the river. Bengough's battalion withdrew after learning of the British defeat and together with the Border Guard took steps to defend Natal.

Interim period 
Following the defeat at Isandlwana the Border Guard was strengthened with additional levies from the interior regions of Natal.  A contingent at Weenen, formed from men from the disbanded 3rd Regiment NNC and the Newcastle Scouts – an African mounted unit numbering some 50 men – was used to support the Border Guard.   A number of Zulu-speaking interpreters were posted to the unit on detachment from the Royal Durban Rifles.  In April the unit received an issue of obsolete Pattern 1853 Enfield rifled muskets, sufficient to arm one quarter of the men.  Some units of the Border Guard were reinvigorated by the receipt of firearms and asked to join British forces on raids into Zululand.  Chelmsford was in favour of this but opposition from Bulwer and Frere confined the Border Guard to Natal.  By May 1879 the expanded unit numbered some 7,700 men.

The Border Guard had acted in support of a British raid into Zululand in March by garrisoning the drifts on a  stretch of river.  Later in the month a unit was ordered by British Major Twentyman to cross the river and burn some Zulu homesteads but refused to do so, in accordance with their standing orders – though the Border Guard did exchange fire with a Zulu force across the river.  Twentyman protested to the colonial authorities and requested that restrictions be dropped but this was to no avail.  In April the Border Guard took possession of a fort – known as Fort Montgomery – at the Middle Drift that had been constructed by the NNC to support a raid in Zulu territory.  During this time there were also Border Guard units at Mgonweni Drift, Kwelbomvu Drift, Shushu, Ngubana Drift and Mpisi Drift.  Other Border Guard posts were Fort Lucas and Thring's Post Fort in the sixth defensive district.  A fallback position for the Border guard was established at Hullett's Stockade in Kearsney on the northern portion of the Natal coast.  A unit of African Amangwani Scouts formed part of the Border Guard reserve until April 1879 when they were brought under military control to augment the cavalry of the second invasion force.

Second invasion 
The British second invasion began on 31 May 1879.  The Border Guard may have taken possession of Fort Bengough, between Greytown and Helpmekaar, from the 2nd Regiment NNC who took part in the invasion.  In July some men of the Border Guard were drafted into an unarmed carrier corps to provide logistical support for the British column; the men proved less efficient than the previous method of ox wagon transport and the unit was soon disbanded.  The Border Guard at the Middle Drift proved unable to effectively confront a Zulu raid there in July.

The dispute between Bulwer and Chelmsford over the deployment of the Border Guard came to an end on 15 July 1879 when Garnet Wolseley assumed the role of supreme British civil and military commander in the region.  By this point the war had ended and Wolseley had disarmed the Border Guard by the end of the month.  In August Henry Fynn, who had raised the Border Guard of the Umsinga region, negotiated the submission of the Zulu chiefs along the Mzinyathi River.  The Natal Border Guard was disbanded after the war; there is no record of the date this occurred but the NNC was disbanded in September and the related Natal Pioneers in October.

References

Bibliography 

British colonial regiments
Colony of Natal
1878 establishments in the British Empire
Military units and formations established in 1878
Anglo-Zulu War